Cephalotes is a genus of tree-dwelling ant species from the Americas, commonly known as turtle ants. All appear to be gliding ants, with the ability to "parachute" and steer their fall so as to land back on the tree trunk rather than fall to the ground, which is often flooded.

Ecological specialization and evolution of a soldier caste
One of the most important aspects of the genus' social evolution and adaptation is the manner in which their social organization has been shaped by environmental pressures. This is particularly true of the species Cephalotes rohweri, in which an entire soldier class has evolved as a result of highly specialized nest cavity availability.

Because ants within Cephalotes use multiple carved nesting cavities found in the trees upon which they live, a cohort of morphologically specialized soldiers has evolved to defend these nesting cavities. They use their unique plate-like heads to block the entrances to the nests, essentially creating a living door to the nest cavities.

In one particular study, Scott Powell tested the hypothesis that "specialized use of cavities with entrances close to the area of one ant head has selected for a morphologically and behaviorally specialized soldier in Cephalotes." This was accomplished by performing comparative studies between four Cephalotes species, each representing one of the four character states of soldier evolution. Cephalotes was ideal for the study because it is the only genus to contain extant species displaying four levels of major morphological evolution. These character states are:

 No soldier present (ancestral)
 Soldiers present with simple domed head
 Soldiers present with incomplete head-disk
 Soldiers present with complete head disk (most advanced)

Another study by Powell examined the process by which environmental factors shape colonial castes within the worker class. However, this study focused more on how colonies adapt their caste systems to ecological factors in their environment.

For the experiment, a species of the genus Cephalotes was used that displayed the highest level of soldier specialization. Three key findings regarding adaptive caste specialization were supported:

 Soldiers were best at defending the specific nesting resource found in nature.
 Colonies used only certain nests (out of all the available nests), and selected only the nesting sites that would maximize soldier performance.
 Soldier performance and limitations had both direct and indirect effects on colony reproduction.

The results of this experiment support the concept that the most specialized soldier phenotype in Cephalotes is a result of adaptation to ecological specialization within a narrow subset of available nests.

Species

 Cephalotes adolphi (Emery, 1906)
 Cephalotes alfaroi (Emery, 1890)
 †Cephalotes alveolatus (Vierbergen & Scheven, 1995) 
 Cephalotes angustus (Mayr, 1862)
 Cephalotes argentatus (Smith, 1853)
 Cephalotes argentiventris De Andrade, 1999
 Cephalotes atratus (Linnaeus, 1758)
 Cephalotes auriger De Andrade, 1999
 Cephalotes basalis (Smith, 1876)
 Cephalotes betoi De Andrade, 1999
 Cephalotes biguttatus (Emery, 1890)
 Cephalotes bimaculatus (Smith, 1860)
 Cephalotes bivestitus (Santschi, 1922)
 Cephalotes bloosi Baroni Urbani, 1999
 Cephalotes bohlsi (Emery, 1896)
 Cephalotes borgmeieri (Kempf, 1951)
 Cephalotes brevispineus De Andrade & Baroni Urbani, 1999
 Cephalotes bruchi (Forel, 1912)
 †Cephalotes caribicus De Andrade & Baroni Urbani, 1999
 Cephalotes chacmul Snelling, 1999
 Cephalotes christopherseni (Forel, 1912)
 Cephalotes clypeatus (Fabricius, 1804)
 Cephalotes coffeae (Kempf, 1953)
 Cephalotes columbicus (Forel, 1912)
 Cephalotes complanatus (Guerin-Meneville, 1844)
 Cephalotes conspersus (Smith, 1867)
 Cephalotes cordatus (Smith, 1853)
 Cephalotes cordiae (Stitz, 1913)
 Cephalotes cordiventris (Santschi, 1931)
 Cephalotes crenaticeps (Mayr, 1866)
 Cephalotes cristatus (Emery, 1890)
 Cephalotes curvistriatus (Forel, 1899)
 Cephalotes decolor De Andrade, 1999
 Cephalotes decoloratus De Andrade, 1999
 Cephalotes dentidorsum De Andrade, 1999
 Cephalotes depressus (Klug, 1824)
 †Cephalotes dieteri De Andrade & Baroni Urbani, 1999
 Cephalotes dorbignyanus (Smith, 1853)
 Cephalotes duckei (Forel, 1906)
 Cephalotes ecuadorialis De Andrade, 1999
 Cephalotes eduarduli (Forel, 1921)
 Cephalotes emeryi (Forel, 1912)
 Cephalotes fiebrigi (Forel, 1906)
 Cephalotes flavigaster De Andrade, 1999
 Cephalotes foliaceus (Emery, 1906)
 Cephalotes fossithorax (Santschi, 1921)
 Cephalotes frigidus (Kempf, 1960)
 Cephalotes gabicamacho Oliveira, Powell & Feitosa, 2021
 Cephalotes goeldii (Forel, 1912)
 Cephalotes goniodontes De Andrade, 1999
 Cephalotes grandinosus (Smith, 1860)
 Cephalotes guayaki De Andrade, 1999
 Cephalotes haemorrhoidalis (Latreille, 1802)
 Cephalotes hamulus (Roger, 1863)
 Cephalotes hirsutus De Andrade, 1999
 †Cephalotes hispaniolicus De Andrade & Baroni Urbani, 1999
 Cephalotes inaequalis (Mann, 1916)
 Cephalotes inca (Santschi, 1911)
 Cephalotes incertus (Emery, 1906)
 Cephalotes insularis (Wheeler, 1934)
 Cephalotes integerrimus (Vierbergen & Scheven, 1995)
 Cephalotes jamaicensis (Forel, 1922)
 Cephalotes jansei (Vierbergen & Scheven, 1995)
 Cephalotes jheringi (Emery, 1894)
 Cephalotes klugi (Emery, 1894)
 Cephalotes kukulcan Snelling, 1999
 Cephalotes laminatus (Smith, 1860)
 Cephalotes lanuginosus (Santschi, 1919)
 Cephalotes lenca De Andrade, 1999
 Cephalotes liepini De Andrade, 1999
 Cephalotes liogaster (Santschi, 1916)
 Cephalotes liviaprado Oliveira, Powell & Feitosa, 2021
 Cephalotes maculatus (Smith, 1876)
 Cephalotes manni (Kempf, 1951)
 Cephalotes marginatus (Fabricius, 1804)
 Cephalotes mariadeandrade Oliveira, Powell & Feitosa, 2021
 Cephalotes marycorn Oliveira, Powell & Feitosa, 2021
 Cephalotes maya De Andrade, 1999
 Cephalotes membranaceus (Klug, 1824) 
 Cephalotes minutus (Fabricius, 1804)
 Cephalotes mompox De Andrade, 1999
 Cephalotes monicaulyssea Oliveira, Powell & Feitosa, 2021
 Cephalotes multispinosus (Norton, 1868) 
 Cephalotes nilpiei De Andrade, 1999 
 Cephalotes notatus (Mayr, 1866)
 Cephalotes obscurus (Vierbergen & Scheven, 1995)
 Cephalotes oculatus (Spinola, 1851)
 Cephalotes olmecus De Andrade, 1999 
 Cephalotes opacus Santschi, 1920
 Cephalotes pallens (Klug, 1824)
 Cephalotes pallidicephalus (Smith, 1876)
 Cephalotes pallidoides De Andrade, 1999
 Cephalotes pallidus De Andrade, 1999
 Cephalotes palta De Andrade, 1999
 Cephalotes palustris De Andrade, 1999
 Cephalotes patei (Kempf, 1951)
 Cephalotes patellaris (Mayr, 1866)
 Cephalotes pavonii (Latreille, 1809)
 Cephalotes pellans De Andrade, 1999
 Cephalotes persimilis De Andrade, 1999
 Cephalotes persimplex De Andrade, 1999
 Cephalotes peruviensis De Andrade, 1999
 Cephalotes pileini De Andrade, 1999
 Cephalotes pilosus (Emery, 1896)
 Cephalotes pinelii (Guerin-Meneville, 1844)
 Cephalotes placidus (Smith, 1860)
 Cephalotes poinari Baroni Urbani, 1999
 Cephalotes porrasi (Wheeler, 1942)
 Cephalotes prodigiosus (Santschi, 1921)
 Cephalotes pusillus (Klug, 1824)
 Cephalotes quadratus (Mayr, 1868)
 Cephalotes ramiphilus (Forel, 1904)
 Cephalotes resinae De Andrade, 1999
 Cephalotes rohweri (Wheeler, 1916)
 Cephalotes scutulatus (Smith, 1867)
 Cephalotes serraticeps (Smith, 1858)
 Cephalotes serratus (Vierbergen & Scheven, 1995)
 Cephalotes setulifer (Emery, 1894)
 Cephalotes simillimus (Kempf, 1951)
 Cephalotes sobrius (Kempf, 1958)
 Cephalotes solidus (Kempf, 1974)
 Cephalotes specularis Brandão et al., 2014
 Cephalotes spinosus (Mayr, 1862)
 Cephalotes squamosus (Vierbergen & Scheven, 1995)
 Cephalotes sucinus De Andrade, 1999
 Cephalotes supercilii De Andrade, 1999
 Cephalotes taino De Andrade, 1999
 Cephalotes targionii (Emery, 1894)
 Cephalotes texanus (Santschi, 1915)
 Cephalotes toltecus De Andrade, 1999
 Cephalotes trichophorus De Andrade, 1999
 Cephalotes umbraculatus (Fabricius, 1804)
 Cephalotes unimaculatus (Smith, 1853)
 Cephalotes ustus (Kempf, 1973)
 Cephalotes varians (Smith, 1876)
 Cephalotes ventriosus De Andrade, 1999
 Cephalotes vinosus (Wheeler, 1936)
 Cephalotes wheeleri (Forel, 1901)

See also
Aphantochilus, a genus of crab spiders known to mimic Cephalotes species

References

External links

 
Myrmicinae
Ant genera